Huji or HUJI may refer to:

Hebrew University of Jerusalem, university in Israel
Harkat-ul-Jihad-al-Islami, Islamic fundamentalist organization
Hukou system (户籍), household registration system in mainland China and the Republic of China (Taiwan)
Towns in mainland China
Huji, Shangshui County (胡吉镇), in Shangshui County, Henan

Written as "胡集镇":
Huji, Lixin County, in Lixin County, Anhui
Huji, Zhongxiang, in Zhongxiang City, Hubei
Huji, Hai'an County, in Hai'an County, Jiangsu
Huji, Lianshui County, in Lianshui County, Jiangsu
Huji, Shuyang County, in Shuyang County, Jiangsu
Huji, Huimin County, in Huimin County, Shandong
Huji, Jinxiang County, in Jinxiang County, Shandong

Townships (胡集乡) in mainland China
Huji Township, Dancheng County, in Dancheng County, Henan
Huji Township, Minquan County, in Minquan County, Henan
Huji Township, Heze, in Mudan District, Heze, Shandong